Harry Ralston "Bud" Black (born June 30, 1957) is an American professional baseball manager and former player who is the manager of the Colorado Rockies. He played in Major League Baseball (MLB) as a pitcher from 1981 through 1995, most notably  for the Kansas City Royals and Cleveland Indians. He coached the Anaheim Angels / Los Angeles Angels of Anaheim from 2000 through 2006, and managed the San Diego Padres from 2007 through 2015. He was named the National League Manager of the Year in 2010.

Early life
Black is a graduate of Mark Morris High School in Longview, Washington. He initially attended Lower Columbia College and pitched for the school's baseball team. He was selected by the San Francisco Giants in the third round of the 1977 January amateur draft and again in the second round of the 1977 June amateur draft by the New York Mets, but he did not sign with either team. He later attended San Diego State University, pitching for the Aztecs in his junior and senior seasons. He graduated in 1979 with a bachelor's degree in management.

Professional career

Seattle Mariners
Following his graduation from San Diego State, Black was selected by the Seattle Mariners in the 17th round of 1979 Major League Baseball draft, the 417th overall pick. The Mariners initially assigned him to the San Jose Missions of the Class A-Advanced California League, where he pitched in 17 games, mostly in relief, and posted a 3.00 ERA. He spent the entire 1980 season with San Jose, posting a 5–3 win-loss record with a 3.45 ERA in 32 appearances. In 1981, Black spent time with the Triple-A Spokane Indians and Double-A Lynn Sailors, posting a 3–6 record and 3.13 ERA in 11 starts and 26 total appearances.

Black made his major league debut with the Mariners on September 5, 1981, in a relief appearance where he faced only one batter (Rick Miller of the Boston Red Sox) and gave up a hit. He only made one more appearance that season, the following day where he pitched 1 inning, gave up 1 hit, and issued 3 walks.

Kansas City Royals
In March 1982, the Mariners traded Black to the Kansas City Royals in exchange for Manny Castillo. At the time of the trade, Royals general manager John Schuerholz said that the team intended to use Black out of the bullpen. He began the 1982 season in the major leagues, primarily as a reliever. On April 18, Black made his first major league start, lasting  innings but ultimately giving up 9 hits, 7 runs, and 4 walks to the Cleveland Indians. He was optioned in May to the Triple-A Omaha Royals, where he posted a 3–1 record with a 2.49 ERA in 4 starts. The Royals recalled Black to the major leagues in June to add him to the starting rotation. In his first start back, he pitched 7 innings and held the Minnesota Twins to 5 hits and 1 earned run, striking out 2 and walking 2. By the end of 1982, Black had a 4–6 record with a 4.58 ERA across  innings.

In 1983, Black began the season with Triple-A Omaha. He was called up in late May and made his season debut on May 25 against the Texas Rangers, lasting  innings and giving up 2 earned runs. On July 24 against the New York Yankees, Black pitched the first 6 innings of what would ultimately become the Pine Tar Incident, an incident where George Brett's go-ahead home run was overturned to become a game-ending out because the umpires decided there was too much pine tar on Brett's bat. Black received a no-decision instead of a loss because the game was protested, causing the league to reinstate Brett's go-ahead home run. On August 4 and 9, Black threw back-to-back complete games, both against the Milwaukee Brewers. By the end of the season, Black had a 10–7 record,  innings pitched, and a 3.79 ERA.

By 1984, Black had established himself as a notable member of the Royals rotation. The team made him the Opening Day starter, opening the season with a 7 inning, 2 run outing against the New York Yankees. On May 23, Black threw the first shutout of his career, blanking the Chicago White Sox. In 1984, Black threw 8 complete games. On September 17 in a game against the California Angels, Reggie Jackson hit his 500th career home run off of Black. By the end of the regular season, Black had a 17–12 record, 257 innings pitched, a 3.12 ERA, and an AL-leading 1.128 walks plus hits per innings pitched (WHIP). Black was called upon to be at the forefront of the Royals rotation in the 1984 American League Championship Series, but he surrendered 7 hits and 4 earned runs across 5 innings as his team was swept by the Detroit Tigers in 3 games.

In 1985, Black was the Royals' Opening Day starter for the second consecutive season. He pitched  innings against the Toronto Blue Jays, giving up 4 hits and 1 earned run. He threw 5 complete games that year, 2 of which were shutouts. He finished the regular season with a 10–15 record,  innings pitched, and a 4.33 ERA. In the postseason, Black was utilized as both a starting pitcher and relief pitcher. He started game 2 of the 1985 American League Championship Series, lasting 7 innings while giving up 5 hits and 3 runs (2 earned). In game 6, Black was utilized as a long reliever, holding the Blue Jays scoreless through  innings and earning the hold. In game 1 of the 1985 World Series, Black pitched the final  of the top of the 9th inning. In game 4 of the series, he started and went 5 innings against the Cardinals but gave up 4 hits, 3 earned runs, and took the loss.

1986 started as planned for Black — he was once again the Opening Day starter, but he struggled against the New York Yankees with 6 hits and 4 earned runs surrendered across 7 innings. Through his first 3 starts, Black posted a 6.43 ERA, prompting the Royals to move him to the bullpen. He made his first relief appearance in years on April 22, pitching  of an inning against the Yankees and giving up one hit. Black's output improved as a member of the bullpen, ultimately posting a 4–8 record, collecting 9 saves and 6 holds while posting a 2.78 ERA in his 107 innings of relief appearances.

Black split the 1987 season between the rotation and bullpen, intermittently moving between starting and relieving. He opened the season as a reliever, not giving up an earned run through his first 5 appearances but blowing a save with 2 earned runs on April 29. In May, the Royals made the decision to move Black to the starting rotation. He primarily remained as a starter throughout the season, making three relief appearances in September but starting in his final appearance of the year. He finished the year with an 8–6 record, 1 save,  innings pitched, and a 3.60 ERA.

Black opened the 1988 season with the Royals, only working as a reliever. He made 17 appearances and pitched 22 innings, posting a 2–1 record and a 4.91 ERA.

Cleveland Indians
On June 3, 1988, the Royals traded Black to the Cleveland Indians in exchange for Pat Tabler. The Indians went the same direction as the Royals, initially using Black as a relief pitcher. He made his Indians debut on June 5, collecting 1 strikeout against the Detroit Tigers. In July, the Indians converted Black back to a starting pitcher. His stint in the rotation that year lasted 7 games, a stretch where he threw 37 innings, posting a 1–2 record with a 4.86 ERA. In late September, Cleveland moved Black to the bullpen once again for his final two appearances of the season.

In the 1988–89 offseason, Black became a free agent but ultimately re-signed with the Indians a month afterward. In 1989, he experienced a revival in his pitching career, being named as the Indians #2 starter behind Greg Swindell. He made his season debut on April 6 against the Milwaukee Brewers, pitching  innings while giving up 8 hits and 2 earned runs. In 1989, Black pitched 6 complete games, 3 of which were shutouts. He finished the year with a 12–11 record,  innings pitched, and a 3.36 ERA.

In 1990, Black was Cleveland's Opening Day starter, going 5 innings with 6 hits and 3 earned runs surrendered against the New York Yankees. He remained the team's ace for most of the year, starting 29 games where posted an 11–10 record with 191 innings pitched and a 3.53 ERA. He threw 5 complete games in that stretch, 2 of which were shutouts.

Toronto Blue Jays
On September 16, 1990, the Indians traded Black to the Toronto Blue Jays for Mauro Gozzo and two players to be named later (Steve Cummings and Alex Sanchez). He made his final 3 appearances of the 1990 season with Toronto, including 1 relief appearance and 2 starts. Following the season, he was granted free agency.

San Francisco Giants
On November 9, 1990, Black signed a four-year, $10 million contract with the San Francisco Giants. In the 1991 season, he was placed second in the starting rotation behind John Burkett. He made his Giants debut on April 10, going 7 innings against the San Diego Padres, giving up 4 hits, 4 runs, and striking out 10. He threw 3 shutouts in 1991, including back-to-back shutouts on May 5 and 10, both times against the New York Mets. He finished the season with a 12–16 record,  innings pitched, and a 3.99 ERA.

Black spent the first month of the 1992 season sidelined due to a back sprain he suffered during spring training. He made his season debut on May 9 against the Montreal Expos, surrendering 7 hits and 8 runs (7 earned) through  innings. He threw 2 complete games, one of which was a shutout. He finished with a 10–12 record, 177 innings pitched, and a 3.97 ERA.

In 1993, following an August 3 game against the San Diego Padres, Black suffered elbow inflammation that ended his season due to a 60-day disabled list placement. He finished with an 8–2 record,  innings pitched, and a 3.56 ERA.

In 1994, Black pitched a limited number of games due to the 1994–95 Major League Baseball strike that prematurely ended the season. He went 4–2 with  innings pitched and a 4.47 ERA. Following the season, Black became a free agent.

Second stint with Cleveland
On April 7, 1995, Black signed a minor-league contract with the Cleveland Indians, marking his second stint with the organization. He was later signed to a major-league deal on April 25. He struggled through 10 starts and 1 relief appearance with the team, posting a 4–2 record in  innings pitched with a 6.85 ERA. The Indians released Black on July 14.

Following his release from the Indians, several organizations contacted Black about joining their team, but he was only interested in pitching in San Francisco or Cleveland. As a result, he retired as a player in August 1995 and was hired as a special assistant in the Indians organization. His final career stats were a 121–116 record,  innings pitched, 398 games (296 started), a 3.84 ERA, a 1.267 WHIP, 1,039 strikeouts, 12 shutouts, and 11 saves.

International career
Between MLB seasons, Black pitched for the Leones del Caracas of the Venezuela Winter League and was a member of the 1982 Caribbean Series champion team.

Coaching and managerial career

Cleveland Indians organization
In 1998, Black was the pitching coach for the Buffalo Bisons, Cleveland's Triple-A affiliate. When Charlie Manuel was tapped to manage the Indians for the 2000 season, Black was considered a finalist for the team's pitching coach position, but Dick Pole was hired instead.

Anaheim Angels
On November 23, 1999, Anaheim Angels manager Mike Scioscia hired Black to be the team's pitching coach, joining a group of new assistant coaching hires that also included Joe Maddon, Alfredo Griffin, Ron Roenicke, and Mickey Hatcher. Black took over an Angels starting rotation that was considered subpar by the media in the previous season. He worked with young pitchers like Jarrod Washburn, Ramón Ortiz, and Scott Schoeneweis.

Under Black's direction in 2002, Angels pitchers combined for a 3.69 ERA and a .247 batting average against (BAA), both good for fourth-best in the league. In October 2002, as the Angels were preparing for the 2002 World Series, the Cleveland Indians inquired about Black becoming the team's next manager after the firing of Charlie Manuel. Black declined the job offer and Eric Wedge was hired instead. Black and the Angels took on the Giants in the World Series, a team led by Dusty Baker, the manager of the 1993 and 1994 Giants teams that Black pitched for. Following the Angels' defeat of the Giants and the subsequent release of Baker, Black was named as a potential candidate for the San Francisco managerial job.

On October 24, 2003, the Angels gave Black a one-year contract extension to remain with the team through the 2004 season. In November 2003, Black was interviewed by the Boston Red Sox for the team's managerial opening, but the job went to Terry Francona and Black remained with the Angels.

Black coached Bartolo Colón in 2005 during his AL Cy Young-winning season.

San Diego Padres
In October , Brian Sabean, general manager of the Giants, interviewed Black for the Giants' vacant managerial position. After the position went to Padres manager Bruce Bochy, Black became a candidate for the Padres job, and was officially hired on November 8, 2006. During the 2009 season, Black was given a contract extension for the 2010 season with a club option for 2011. During the 2010 season, the Padres gave Black another three-year extension through 2013, with club options in 2014 and 2015.
In 2010, Black presided over the worst collapse in Padres history when they went on a ten-game losing streak with a little over a month left in the season, went 12–16 in September and squandered a -game lead over the Giants for the NL West title. Black nonetheless was the winner of the 2010 National League Manager of the Year Award, edging Dusty Baker of the Cincinnati Reds in voting by a single point. Black is only the third former full-time pitcher to win a Manager of the Year Award, joining Tommy Lasorda and Larry Dierker.

On June 15, 2015, Black was fired after eight-plus seasons with the Padres after the team started 2015 at 32–33 and was six games behind in the National League West. He finished with a record of 649 wins and 713 losses.

On October 28, 2015, The Washington Post reported that the Washington Nationals intended to hire Black as their new manager following the 2015 World Series, replacing fired manager Matt Williams. However, it was later reported that he would not be getting the job. Black turned down the Nationals offer, which he considered to be too low.

Return to the Los Angeles Angels
On November 25, 2015, it was announced that Black would be returning to the Los Angeles Angels to serve as a special assistant to the new General Manager, Billy Eppler.  Black previously served as a pitching coach for the team from 2000 to 2006.

Colorado Rockies

On November 7, 2016, the Colorado Rockies announced the team had hired Black as its new manager. On April 3, 2017, Black won his Rockies debut, defeating the Milwaukee Brewers on Opening Day, notching his 650th win as a manager. On February 8, 2022, the Rockies extended Black through the 2023 season.

On April 10, 2022, Black earned his 1,000th career win as a manager in a game against the Los Angeles Dodgers.

On February 15, 2023, Black signed a one-year contract extension that runs through the 2024 season.

Managerial record

Personal life
Black was born to Canadian parents in Northern California. He and his wife, Nanette, a pediatric ICU nurse, have two daughters: Jamie attended Oregon State University and is currently an interior designer; and Jessie, a collegiate gymnast, graduated from the University of Maryland with a degree in mathematics and kinesiology in 2014.

See also

 List of Colorado Rockies managers
 List of San Diego Padres managers

References

External links

Bud Black: Behind the Dugout
Retrosheet
Venezuelan Professional Baseball League
Love of hockey follows from father to son for Bud Black

1957 births
American expatriate baseball players in Canada
American people of Canadian descent
Anaheim Angels coaches
Baseball coaches from California
Baseball players from California
Bellingham Mariners players
Cleveland Indians players
Kansas City Royals players
Leones del Caracas players
American expatriate baseball players in Venezuela
Living people
Lynn Sailors players
Colorado Rockies managers
Major League Baseball pitchers
Major League Baseball pitching coaches
Manager of the Year Award winners
Omaha Royals players
People from San Mateo, California
Phoenix Firebirds players
San Diego Padres managers
San Diego State Aztecs baseball players
San Francisco Giants players
San Jose Giants players
San Jose Missions players
Seattle Mariners players
Spokane Indians players
Toronto Blue Jays players
Williamsport Bills players
People from Longview, Washington
Lower Columbia Red Devils baseball players